James Aitken Wylie (9 August 1808 – 1 May 1890) was a Scottish historian of religion and Presbyterian minister. He was a prolific writer and is most famous for writing The History of Protestantism.

Life

Wylie was born on 9 August 1808 in Kirriemuir to James Wylie and Margaret Forrest. His name-father, Rev James Aitken, was an Auld Licht Anti-burgher minister in the Secession Church. Wylie was educated at Marischal College, University of Aberdeen, where he studied for three years before transferring to St Andrews University to study under Rev Dr Thomas Chalmers. He followed his name-father's example, entering the Original Secession Divinity Hall, Edinburgh  in 1827.

He was ordained at the Secessionist Church in Dollar, Clackmannanshire, in 1831.

In 1846 he left Dollar to become sub-editor of the Edinburgh religious newspaper the Witness, under Hugh Miller. In 1852, after he had (with the majority of the United Original Secession Church) joined the Free Church of Scotland, Wylie edited their Free Church Record, a role which he continued until 1860.

He published his book The Papacy: its History, Dogmas, Genius, and Prospects in 1851, winning a prize of a hundred guineas from the Evangelical Alliance. The Protestant Institute appointed him Lecturer on Popery in 1860. He continued in this role until his death in 1890, publishing in 1888 his work The Papacy is the Antichrist. He died with his History of the Scottish Nation taken forward to 1286.

Aberdeen University awarded him an honorary doctorate (LL.D.) in 1856.

Wylie's classic work, The History of Protestantism (1878), went out of print in the 1920s, although it was briefly reprinted in Northern Ireland in a two-volume reproduction in the late 20th century. It has received praise from a number of influential figures, including Ian Paisley. The History of Protestantism was also reprinted by Hartland Publications, Rapidan, Virginia, USA in 2002 in four volumes. . It has now been re-published, as a 3-volume hardback set, by Reformation Heritage Books.

He died at 12 Archibald Place (next to the old Edinburgh Royal Infirmary on 1 May 1890. He is buried with his wife, Euphemia Gray (1808–1845) and their children, in East Preston Street Burial Ground. The grave lies in the eastern part of the south-east section.

Publications
 The Seventh Vial, (1848) online ebook
 History of the Waldenses, (1880) , online ebook
 Rome and civil liberty: or, The papal aggression in its relation to the sovereignty of the Queen and the independence of the nation, (1865), online ebook
 The Awakening of Italy and the Crisis of Rome. Religious Tract Society: London, (1866) Octavo. 	
 A Popish University for Ireland. The Irish Chief Secretary and the working classes. (1889). pp. 8. 22 cm.
 Character-its paramount influence on the happiness of individuals, and the destinies of society. In : Course. A Course of Lectures to young men ... delivered in Glasgow ... Second Series. Lect. 4. 1842. 12º.
 The Papacy: Its History, Dogmas, Genius, and Prospects — which was awarded a prize by the Evangelical Alliance in 1851. online pdf
 The rise, progress, and insidious workings of Jesuitism, (1877), online ebook
 The Jesuits: Their Moral Maxims and Plots Against Kings, Nations, and Churches, (1881).
 The History of Protestantism (1878).  3 vol. Cassell & Co.: London, 1899. Physical description: 8º. Shelfmark  at British Library: 4650.g.2., online ebook
 The History of Protestantism (2018).  3 vol Inheritance Publications, Neerlandia AB Canada / Pella IA USA newly typeset Hard Cover edition http://www.inhpubl.net/ip/refo500.htm
 The History of The Scottish Nation in 3 volumes (1886) online pdf
 The Papacy is the Antichrist - A Demonstration (1888) online pdf
 Historical Sketch of the Free Church of Scotland

References

Sources

External links
 
 
 
 James A. Wylie: bio and books
 Additional titles are listed at the British Library catalogue at http://catalogue.bl.uk

1808 births
British historians of religion
1890 deaths
Alumni of the University of St Andrews
Alumni of the University of Aberdeen
People from Kirriemuir
Ministers of Secession Churches in Scotland
19th-century Ministers of the Free Church of Scotland